Blue Busking is a 2017 South Korean musical-adventure film directed by Ahn Jae-seok. 

It is a remake of the Italian film Basilicata coast to coast.

Plot
Four friends from Mokpo who formed a band during the high school days, are grown men dealing with the ordinary problems of life. They reunite to take part in a band contest in Jarasum. They plan to go by foot in 30 days busking on the road. A broadcast reporter follows them on their journey.

Cast
Han Ji-sang as Min-woo
Jo Han-sun as Ho-bin
Kim Shin-eui as Young-min
Kim Jae-bum as Byeong-tae
Park Hyo-joo as Hye-kyung
Yang Ye-seung as Min-sook 
Yoon Kyung-ho as Hyeon-woo
Cho Jin-woong (special appearance)
Oh Yoo-na as Oh Yoo-na (special appearance)

Awards

References

External links

2017 films
South Korean musical drama films
South Korean adventure drama films
2010s musical drama films
2010s adventure drama films
2017 drama films
2010s South Korean films
Films about street performance
Musical film remakes
South Korean remakes of foreign films
Remakes of Italian films